Deborah Maria Luisa Moore (born 27 October 1963) is an English actress. She is the daughter of actor Roger Moore and Italian actress Luisa Mattioli.

Career
She made her debut on TV as a child in The Persuaders! episode "The Long Goodbye" in which her father co-starred alongside Tony Curtis, and early on in her career, she was often billed as "Deborah Barrymore". She appeared in such films as Lionheart (1987), Alien Terminator (1988), the 1990 comedy, Bullseye! (opposite her father), Chaplin (1992), Into the Sun (1992), and South Kensington (2001). She is probably best known in the UK as the face of the Scottish Widows advertising campaign from 1986 to 1995 when she was replaced by Amanda Lamb. She later took on the name Deborah Moore.

She has twice made appearances in James Bond–related productions. She played a secretary in the 1989 biopic Goldeneye: The Secret Life of Ian Fleming and later made a cameo appearance as a flight attendant in the 2002 Bond film, Die Another Day, which was Pierce Brosnan's fourth and final Bond film. She also appeared in the 1998 TV movie Merlin: The Quest Begins, opposite Jason Connery, son of former Bond Sean Connery. Her godfather was actor Robert Brown, her father's co-star in the television series Ivanhoe and three Bond films.

She was also a Scottish Widow model. 

In 2006, Moore made the film Provoked. Jagmohan Mundhra's film is based on the landmark UK domestic violence case in which Kiranjit Singh Ahluwalia was jailed in London for killing her abusive husband. Based on her story, the film stars Aishwarya Rai as Ahluwalia. Moore plays Jackie, another prison inmate.

Moore appeared as Alfidia, the mother of a fictionalised Livia, in two 2007 episodes of the HBO/BBC series Rome.

In August 2010, Moore appeared in the series 1 finale of Sherlock, "The Great Game", as the first victim of Jim Moriarty.

Filmography
Warriors of the Apocalypse (1985)
Lionheart (1987) – Mathilda
Alien Terminator (1988) – June
Goldeneye: The Secret Life of Ian Fleming (1989) – Secretary
Bullseye! (1990) – Flo Fleming
Into the Sun (1992) – Maj. Goode
Chaplin (1992) – Lita Grey
On Dangerous Ground (1996) – Hannah Bernstein 
Midnight Man (1997) – Hannah Bernstein 
South Kensington (2001) – Direttrice Bulgari
Die Another Day (2002) – Air Hostess
Provoked (2006) – Jackie
We Still Steal the Old Way (2017) – Anne-Marie

References

External links

1963 births
Living people
20th-century English actresses
21st-century English actresses
Actresses from London
English film actresses
English television actresses
English people of Italian descent